Ove Sjögren (born 20 December 1958) is a Swedish sports shooter. He competed in the men's 10 metre air rifle event at the 1984 Summer Olympics.

References

1958 births
Living people
Swedish male sport shooters
Olympic shooters of Sweden
Shooters at the 1984 Summer Olympics
Sportspeople from Uppsala